Ernie "Indian Red" Lopez (September 24, 1945 – October 3, 2009) was an American professional boxer. He twice fought for the world welterweight boxing title, losing title bouts to José Nápoles in 1970 and 1973. He was a missing person from 1992 to 2004 and was the subject of extensive press coverage in early 2004 when, after being selected for induction into the California Boxing Hall of Fame, he was found at a homeless shelter in Fort Worth, Texas.

Early years
Lopez was born on the Uintah and Ouray Indian Reservation in Fort Duchesne, Utah. His mother was a Ute Indian, and his father was a Juaneño.

Lopez attended Orem High School in Orem, Utah, where he chose boxing over football. He married as a teenager and moved to Pasadena, California, where he boxed out of the Pasadena YMCA. He later recalled that he learned to box from his father and added, "But sometimes I learned when I watched my father hit my mother."

Professional boxing career
Lopez became a popular boxer in Los Angeles during the late 1960s and early 1970s, fighting out of the Los Angeles Main Street Gym for much of his career. His brother, Danny "Little Red" Lopez, also went into boxing and became the world featherweight champion. Both of the Lopez brothers were managed by Howie Steindler.

Lopez was given the nickname "Indian Red" because of his flaming red hair and Native American heritage. In 1968, when Lopez became the first Native American boxer to be ranked as the No. 1 contender in any weight class, Pulitzer Prize winning sports writer Jim Murray wrote:

I don't know how he is as a prize fighter, but Ernie (Indian Red) Lopez certainly is disappointing as an Indian.  I mean, he doesn't look like something John Wayne would chase down the street shouting something about 'damned redskin.'  'Damned redhead,' maybe.  But, Lordy, the skin is even freckled! Now, whoever heard of a red-headed, freckle-skinned Indian? ... 'What was your Indian name?' I asked Indian Red?  'Ernie,' he told me.

Lopez had a career record of 51-10-1, and fought bouts in England, Hawaii, Japan and Mexico.  In 1967, Lopez wore an Indian chief's headdress into the ring in a match against Musahi Nakano in Japan.  Lopez said, "I bought the thing at Disneyland to take over with me. ... I liked it so much I was going to keep it.  But it turned out they have this custom in Japan where the fighters exchange gifts before the fight.  Nakano gave me a samurai warrior's jacket and I gave him the headpiece."

Lopez's three bouts against Hedgemon Lewis in the late 1960s drew extensive media coverage. Going into the first fight in July 1968, Hedgemon Lewis was undefeated in 23 bouts, and both fighters were considered top contenders in the welterweight class. Lopez won the first bout in a ninth-round knockout, which the Los Angeles Times described as follows:

Like Gen. Custer at Little Big Horn, Hedgemon Lewis got to wondering where all those Indians were coming from.  And like his ancestors, Ernie (Indian Red) Lopez staged a fistic massacre Thursday night when he battered the previously unbeaten Lewis into a state of helplessness before a roaring turnaway mob of 10,400 at the Olympic Auditorium.

Lopez won two out of the three bouts with Lewis. In 2004, Lewis said of Lopez, "He was aggressive and always on the attack. Ernie was a crowd-pleaser because he was a fighter. Period. He fought." Actor Ryan O'Neal, who managed Lewis when Lewis fought Lopez, added, "Lopez was a warrior. He was also a gentleman, a decent man. But as a fighter, Lopez would hit the other guy so much he would become exhausted. Because of that, Lopez would always fill an arena, because he would give the fans their money's worth.... It was his heart that made him win." Another writer said of him, "He was an aggressive fighter who knew only one direction: forward."

Title bouts against José Nápoles
On February 14, 1970, Lopez got a shot at the world welterweight boxing title in a bout against Cuban Jose "Mantequilla" Nápoles in front of a sellout crowd at The Forum in Inglewood, California. Lopez was knocked down in the 1st, 9th, and 15th rounds before the bout was called as a technical knockout in the 15th round.  In 1971, boxing writer Dan Hafner said of Lopez:

It is the misfortune of Ernie (Indian Red) Lopez to come along when one of the all-time greats, José Nápoles, rules the welterweight division.  The fiery, part-Ute Indian demonstrated beyond doubt on Thursday night that he is the class of the rest of the 147-pounders.  In his smartest and possibly best fight of his career, Lopez pounded out a unanimous, one-sided 10-round decision over highly regarded Oscar Albarado and gave a masterful performance. 

Sugar Ray Leonard, who watched Nápoles fight Lopez, shared a similar opinion, "If it wasn't for Nápoles, Ernie probably would have been champion."

Lopez got a rematch against Nápoles, and a second shot at the title, three years later on February 28, 1973—again in front of a sellout crowd at The Forum. The second bout proved to be a turning point in Lopez's life. Lopez had reportedly won the first six rounds, and Nápoles had cuts above and below his eye and on the bridge of his nose. At the start of the seventh round, Nápoles hit Lopez squarely in the face, and Lopez fell to the canvas, where he lay unconscious for three minutes. After the knockout, Nápoles cradled Lopez's head and repeated, "Please wake up. Please wake up."

Wanderer and missing person
Reports indicate that Lopez's life went into a tailspin after the 1973 loss to Nápoles. He fought two more bouts and lost both in technical knockouts. He was divorced from his wife and took to a life of wandering. His brother, Danny Lopez, said, "It was the losses to Nápoles and the divorce that sent Ernie into a tailspin. He was a hurt man."  Lopez's ex-wife also attributed the decline to the loss to Nápoles: "I think he lost confidence, his goal was destroyed. He was depressed and angry. We started having marital problems."

For twelve years from 1992 through 2004, Lopez was out of touch with his family and was considered a missing person. His ex-wife said, "The last time I saw him, he was kind of a street person. That was in 1992. He gave up all of his possessions and then went out in the world like a person wandering. It was really sad because he just gave up."

Rediscovery and Hall of Fame
In early 2004, Lopez was selected for induction into the California Boxing Hall of Fame. With the impetus of the Hall of Fame induction ceremony, a police officer with the Los Angeles Police Department agreed to assist Lopez's family in trying to locate him. In February 2004, Lopez was discovered living in a homeless shelter in Fort Worth, Texas. When contacted by his ex-wife in 2004, Lopez stated, "I'm not lost.  I'm right here." On learning of his selection for the Hall of Fame, Lopez told the Los Angeles Times, "Why are they doing this for me? I wasn't good enough for the Hall of Fame." Shortly thereafter, Lopez was re-united with his four children and 23 grandchildren.

Lopez's story became the subject of multiple newspaper and television stories, with reporters and television camera crews coming to the homeless shelter to interview him. He told the Los Angeles Times at the time that he did not recall why he moved to Fort Worth, but he recalled "living with a church family in Missouri, shoveling snow for a hotel owner in Portland, Maine, sleeping in New York's Central Park, working construction in Florida and cleaning hotel rooms in Phoenix." He told another reporter, "I've been all over the United States. Might have missed a few states, but it's sure a nice place. But I never stayed too long anywhere."

Death
On October 3, 2009, Lopez died in Pleasant Grove, Utah from complications of dementia at age 64.

Professional boxing record

|-
|align="center" colspan=8|48 Wins (24 knockouts, 24 decisions), 13 Losses (6 knockouts, 7 decisions), 1 Draw 
|-
| align="center" style="border-style: none none solid solid; background: #e3e3e3"|Result
| align="center" style="border-style: none none solid solid; background: #e3e3e3"|Record
| align="center" style="border-style: none none solid solid; background: #e3e3e3"|Opponent
| align="center" style="border-style: none none solid solid; background: #e3e3e3"|Type
| align="center" style="border-style: none none solid solid; background: #e3e3e3"|Round
| align="center" style="border-style: none none solid solid; background: #e3e3e3"|Date
| align="center" style="border-style: none none solid solid; background: #e3e3e3"|Location
| align="center" style="border-style: none none solid solid; background: #e3e3e3"|Notes
|-align=center
|Loss
|
|align=left| Kenny Louis
|KO
|1
|07/07/1987
|align=left| Omni New Daisy Theater, Memphis, Tennessee, U.S.
|align=left|
|-
|Loss
|
|align=left| John Stracey
|TKO
|7
|29/10/1974
|align=left| Royal Albert Hall, London, England
|align=left|
|-
|Loss
|
|align=left| Armando Muniz
|TKO
|7
|26/07/1973
|align=left| Olympic Auditorium, Los Angeles, California, U.S.
|align=left|
|-
|Loss
|
|align=left| Jose Napoles
|KO
|7
|28/02/1973
|align=left| Inglewood Forum, Inglewood, California, U.S.
|align=left|
|-
|Win
|
|align=left| Jose Luis Baltazar
|KO
|5
|10/11/1972
|align=left| Los Angeles Sports Arena, Los Angeles, California, U.S.
|align=left|
|-
|Win
|
|align=left| Manuel Gonzalez
|RTD
|5
|12/10/1972
|align=left| Sahara Tahoe, Stateline, Nevada, U.S.
|align=left|
|-
|Loss
|
|align=left| Emile Griffith
|UD
|10
|30/03/1972
|align=left| Olympic Auditorium, Los Angeles, California, U.S.
|align=left|
|-
|Win
|
|align=left| Sal Martinez
|TKO
|3
|20/01/1972
|align=left| Olympic Auditorium, Los Angeles, California, U.S.
|align=left|
|-
|Win
|
|align=left| Oscar Albarado
|UD
|10
|28/10/1971
|align=left| Olympic Auditorium, Los Angeles, California, U.S.
|align=left|
|-
|Win
|
|align=left| Manuel Fierro
|UD
|10
|16/09/1971
|align=left| Olympic Auditorium, Los Angeles, California, U.S.
|align=left|
|-
|Win
|
|align=left| "Dangerous" Danny Perez
|TKO
|2
|08/07/1971
|align=left| Olympic Auditorium, Los Angeles, California, U.S.
|align=left|
|-
|Loss
|
|align=left| Emile Griffith
|MD
|10
|03/05/1971
|align=left| Nevada Sports Palace, Las Vegas, Nevada, U.S.
|align=left|
|-
|Win
|
|align=left| Peter Cobblah
|MD
|10
|20/01/1971
|align=left| Silver Slipper, Las Vegas, Nevada, U.S.
|align=left|
|-
|Win
|
|align=left| Cipriano Hernandez
|UD
|10
|10/10/1970
|align=left| Valley Music Theater, Woodland Hills, California, U.S.
|align=left|
|-
|Win
|
|align=left| Ruben "Sandwich" Rivera
|KO
|6
|03/08/1970
|align=left| Sacramento, California, U.S.
|align=left|
|-
|Win
|
|align=left| Manuel Avitia
|KO
|8
|08/07/1970
|align=left| Las Vegas, Nevada, U.S.
|align=left|
|-
|Loss
|
|align=left| Jose Napoles
|TKO
|15
|14/02/1970
|align=left| Inglewood Forum, Inglewood, California, U.S.
|align=left|
|-
|Win
|
|align=left| Hedgemon Lewis
|TKO
|10
|04/10/1969
|align=left| Los Angeles Sports Arena, Los Angeles, California, U.S.
|align=left|
|-
|Loss
|
|align=left| Hedgemon Lewis
|UD
|10
|10/07/1969
|align=left| Olympic Auditorium, Los Angeles, California, U.S.
|align=left|
|-
|Win
|
|align=left| Chucho Garcia
|UD
|10
|13/03/1969
|align=left| Olympic Auditorium, Los Angeles, California, U.S.
|align=left|
|-
|Win
|
|align=left| Brad Silas
|KO
|1
|18/02/1969
|align=left| Los Angeles Memorial Coliseum, Los Angeles, California, U.S.
|align=left|
|-
|Win
|
|align=left| Raul Soriano
|TKO
|9
|30/01/1969
|align=left| Olympic Auditorium, Los Angeles, California, U.S.
|align=left|
|-
|Win
|
|align=left| Polo Corona
|PTS
|10
|31/07/1968
|align=left| Silver Slipper, Las Vegas, Nevada, U.S.
|align=left|
|-
|Win
|
|align=left| Hedgemon Lewis
|TKO
|9
|18/07/1968
|align=left| Olympic Auditorium, Los Angeles, California, U.S.
|align=left|
|-
|Win
|
|align=left| Gabe Terronez
|UD
|12
|30/04/1968
|align=left| Selland Arena, Fresno, California, U.S.
|align=left|
|-
|Loss
|
|align=left| Raul Soriano
|UD
|10
|03/03/1968
|align=left| Mexicali, Baja California, Mexico
|align=left|
|-
|Win
|
|align=left| Bob "Robert" Murray
|UD
|10
|08/02/1968
|align=left| Olympic Auditorium, Los Angeles, California, U.S.
|align=left|
|-
|Win
|
|align=left| Doug McLeod
|KO
|4
|20/11/1967
|align=left| Las Vegas, Nevada, U.S.
|align=left|
|-
|Win
|
|align=left| Jose Valenzuela
|TKO
|10
|12/10/1967
|align=left| Olympic Auditorium, Los Angeles, California, U.S.
|align=left|
|-
|Win
|
|align=left| Musashi Nakano
|KO
|3
|08/08/1967
|align=left| Nagoya, Japan
|align=left|
|-
|Win
|
|align=left| Andy Gonzalez
|KO
|7
|06/07/1967
|align=left| Olympic Auditorium, Los Angeles, California, U.S.
|align=left|
|-
|Win
|
|align=left| Phil Robinson
|PTS
|10
|13/06/1967
|align=left| Honolulu, Hawaii, U.S.
|align=left|
|-
|Win
|
|align=left| Ed McGruder
|PTS
|10
|22/05/1967
|align=left| Las Vegas, Nevada, U.S.
|align=left|
|-
|Win
|
|align=left| Frank Jennings
|TKO
|8
|20/04/1967
|align=left| Olympic Auditorium, Los Angeles, California, U.S.
|align=left|
|-
|Win
|
|align=left| Johnny Brooks
|PTS
|10
|27/03/1967
|align=left| Las Vegas, Nevada, U.S.
|align=left|
|-
|Win
|
|align=left| Benito Juarez
|PTS
|10
|06/03/1967
|align=left| Las Vegas, Nevada, U.S.
|align=left|
|-
|Loss
|
|align=left| Adolph Pruitt
|UD
|10
|12/12/1966
|align=left| Silver Slipper, Las Vegas, Nevada, U.S.
|align=left|
|-
|Loss
|
|align=left| Johnny Brooks
|SD
|10
|19/09/1966
|align=left| Silver Slipper, Las Vegas, Nevada, U.S.
|align=left|
|-
|Win
|
|align=left| Johnny Brooks
|PTS
|10
|22/08/1966
|align=left| Silver Slipper, Las Vegas, Nevada, U.S.
|align=left|
|-
|Win
|
|align=left| Tito Marshall
|UD
|10
|21/06/1966
|align=left| Las Vegas Convention Center, Las Vegas, Nevada, U.S.
|align=left|
|-
|Win
|
|align=left| Jose Stable
|UD
|10
|09/05/1966
|align=left| Hacienda Hotel, Las Vegas, Nevada, U.S.
|align=left|
|-
|Win
|
|align=left| Johnny Brooks
|UD
|12
|04/04/1966
|align=left| Hacienda Hotel, Las Vegas, Nevada, U.S.
|align=left|
|-
|Win
|
|align=left| Al Grant
|PTS
|10
|28/02/1966
|align=left| Las Vegas, Nevada, U.S.
|align=left|
|-
|Win
|
|align=left| Mel Fields
|TKO
|3
|14/02/1966
|align=left| Hacienda Hotel, Las Vegas, Nevada, U.S.
|align=left|
|-
|Win
|
|align=left| Memo Lopez
|KO
|6
|31/01/1966
|align=left| Las Vegas Convention Center, Las Vegas, Nevada, U.S.
|align=left|
|-
|Win
|
|align=left| Al Andrews
|PTS
|10
|17/01/1966
|align=left| Las Vegas, Nevada, U.S.
|align=left|
|-
|Win
|
|align=left| Pulga Serrano
|TKO
|4
|20/12/1965
|align=left| Hacienda Hotel, Las Vegas, Nevada, U.S.
|align=left|
|-
|Win
|
|align=left| Armand Laurenco Laurinco
|KO
|1
|06/12/1965
|align=left| Hacienda Hotel, Las Vegas, Nevada, U.S.
|align=left|
|-
|Draw
|
|align=left| Armand Laurenco Laurinco
|PTS
|6
|09/11/1965
|align=left| Las Vegas, Nevada, U.S.
|align=left|
|-
|Win
|
|align=left| Billy Marsh
|PTS
|6
|01/11/1965
|align=left| Hacienda Hotel, Las Vegas, Nevada, U.S.
|align=left|
|-
|Loss
|
|align=left| Don Minor
|UD
|12
|22/12/1964
|align=left| Hacienda Hotel, Las Vegas, Nevada, U.S.
|align=left|
|-
|Win
|
|align=left| Chappell Funnye
|KO
|8
|19/10/1964
|align=left| Santa Monica Civic Auditorium, Santa Monica, California, U.S.
|align=left|
|-
|Win
|
|align=left| Bernie Magallanes
|PTS
|6
|29/09/1964
|align=left| Castaways Hotel, Las Vegas, Nevada, U.S.
|align=left|
|-
|Loss
|
|align=left| Jesse Armenta
|KO
|9
|04/07/1964
|align=left| Hermosillo, Sonora, Mexico
|align=left|
|-
|Win
|
|align=left| Joe Clark
|PTS
|6
|12/06/1964
|align=left| Las Vegas Convention Center, Las Vegas, Nevada, U.S.
|align=left|
|-
|Win
|
|align=left| Andres Herrera
|PTS
|6
|30/03/1964
|align=left| Santa Monica Civic Auditorium, Santa Monica, California, U.S.
|align=left|
|-
|Win
|
|align=left| George Green
|KO
|5
|10/03/1964
|align=left| Castaways Hotel, Las Vegas, Nevada, U.S.
|align=left|
|-
|Win
|
|align=left|Trini Lopez
|PTS
|4
|03/03/1964
|align=left| Valley Garden Arena, North Hollywood, California, U.S.
|align=left|
|-
|Win
|
|align=left| Mickey Davitt
|KO
|1
|13/02/1964
|align=left| Olympic Auditorium, Los Angeles, California, U.S.
|align=left|
|-
|Win
|
|align=left| Carl Moore
|KO
|3
|04/02/1964
|align=left| Castaways Hotel, Las Vegas, Nevada, U.S.
|align=left|
|-
|Win
|
|align=left| Armand Laurenco Laurinco
|PTS
|6
|21/01/1964
|align=left| Castaways Hotel, Las Vegas, Nevada, U.S.
|align=left|
|-
|Win
|
|align=left| John Coopride
|KO
|2
|24/06/1963
|align=left| Fairgrounds Coliseum, Salt Lake City, Utah, U.S.
|align=left|
|}

References

1945 births
2009 deaths
20th-century Native Americans
21st-century Native Americans
American male boxers
Boxers from Utah
Deaths from dementia in Utah
Native American boxers
People from Uintah County, Utah
Sportspeople from Orem, Utah
Ute people
Welterweight boxers